European Formula Three can refer to:

The FIA European Formula Three Championship (1975–1984, 2012–2018)
The FIA European Formula Three Cup, a one-off race (1985–1990, 1999–2004)
The Formula 3 Euro Series (2003–2012)